Chip Robinson (born March 29, 1954, in Philadelphia, Pennsylvania) is a retired race car driver. He won the 1987 IMSA Camel GT series championship and the 1987 24 Hours of Daytona (with Al Holbert, Derek Bell, and Al Unser Jr. in a Porsche and the 1989 12 Hours of Sebring (with Arie Luyendyk and Geoff Brabham) in a Nissan. He made five CART starts in 1986 and 1987 with a best finish of 6th at the 1987 Long Beach Grand Prix.  He is currently a contractor residing in Augusta, Georgia with his wife and one son who aspires to drive as well.

Robinson served as race director of the US Formula 4 championship, a race series to develop young drivers.  He previously was race director for the Formula Atlantic, F2000, and F1600 race series.

IROC Involvement
Chip Robinson was invited to the International Race of Champions in 1988. During this time his best finish was second place, at Riverside International Raceway and was involved in an accident in 1986 at the same track with Doc Bundy and Lyn St. James.

CART PPG Indy Car World Series

References

External links

1954 births
Champ Car drivers
SCCA Formula Super Vee drivers
International Race of Champions drivers
Living people
24 Hours of Le Mans drivers
24 Hours of Daytona drivers
Racing drivers from Philadelphia
World Sportscar Championship drivers
12 Hours of Sebring drivers

Nismo drivers
Team Joest drivers